The Trilogy is an LP boxset containing the albums; Journey to the End of The Night, Light of Day, Day of Darkness and A Blessing in Disguise created by the Norwegian progressive metal band, Green Carnation. The box set is limited to only three hundred and thirty-three copies.

Track listing

Journey to the End of the Night
 "Falling into Darkness" − 2:33
 "In The Realm of the Midnight Sun" − 13:42
 "My Dark Reflections of Life and Death" − 17:50
 "Under Eternal Stars − 15:31"
 "Journey to the End of Night (Part I)" − 11:28
 "Echoes of Despair (Part II)" − 2:30
 "End of Journey (Part III)" − 5:08
 "Shattered (Part IV)" − 1:34

Light of Day, Day of Darkness
 "Light of Day, Day of Darkness" – 60:06 [ 1]

A Blessing in Disguise
 "Crushed to Dust" – 4:26
 "Lullaby in Winter" – 7:49
 "Writings on the Wall" – 5:26
 "Into Deep" – 6:09
 "The Boy in the Attic" – 7:13
 "Two Seconds in Life" – 6:28
 "Myron and Cole" – 5:53
 "As Life Flows By" – 4:45
 "Rain" – 8:06

Credits

 Journey to the End of the Night
 Light of Day, Day of Darkness
 A Blessing in Disguise

References

External links
 Official Green Carnation Website
 "Encyclopaedia Metallum"

Green Carnation albums
2004 compilation albums
Season of Mist albums